Agaraeus is a genus of moths in the family Geometridae.

Ourapterygini
Geometridae genera